This is a list of settlements in Imathia, Greece.

 Agia Marina
 Agia Varvara
 Agios Georgios
 Agkathia
 Alexandreia
 Ammos
 Angelochori
 Arachos
 Arkochori
 Asomata
 Chariessa
 Daskio
 Diavatos
 Episkopi, Alexandreia
 Episkopi, Naousa
 Fyteia
 Georgianoi
 Giannakochori
 Kampochori
 Kastania
 Kato Vermio
 Kavasila
 Kefalochori
 Kleidi
 Kopanos
 Koryfi
 Kouloura
 Koumaria
 Kypseli
 Lefkadia
 Lianovergi
 Loutros
 Lykogianni
 Makrochori
 Marina
 Meliki
 Metochi Prodromou
 Monospita
 Naousa
 Nea Nikomideia
 Neochori
 Neokastro
 Nisi
 Palaio Skyllitsi
 Palatitsia
 Patrida
 Platanos
 Platy
 Polydendro
 Polyplatanos
 Prasinada
 Prodromos
 Profitis Ilias
 Rachi
 Rizomata
 Rodochori
 Sfikia
 Stavros
 Stenimachos
 Sykia
 Trikala
 Trilofo
 Tripotamos
 Vergina
 Veria
 Vrysaki
 Xechasmeni
 Xirolivado
 Zervochori

By municipality

See also
List of towns and villages in Greece

Imathia